Transcription factor SOX-21 is a protein that in humans is encoded by the SOX21 gene. It is a member of the Sox gene family of transcription factors.

Function 

In the chick embryo, Sox21 promotes neuronal cellular differentiation by counteracting the activity of Sox1, Sox2, and Sox3, which maintain neural cells in an undifferentiated state.

SOX21 knockout mice display hair loss beginning from postnatal day 11. New hair regrowth was initiated a few days later but was followed by renewed hair loss. Sox21 is also expressed in the hair shaft cuticle in humans and consequently variants of the Sox21 gene could be responsible for some hair loss conditions in humans.

See also 
SOX genes

References

Further reading 

 
 
 
 
 

Transcription factors